Haemogamasidae is a family of mites in the order Mesostigmata.

Genera
 Acanthochela Ewing, 1933
 Brevisterna Keegan, 1949
 Euhaemogamasus Ewing, 1933
 Eulaelaps Berlese, 1903
 Haemogamasus Berlese, 1889
 Ischyropoda Keegan, 1951
 Terasterna Zhou, Gu & Wen, 1995

References

Mesostigmata
Acari families